The Gruta das Cinco Ribeiras (literally the Cave of Cinco Ribeiras) is a cave situated in the southwest coast of Terceira, located in the civil parish of Cinco Ribeiras, municipality of Angra do Heroísmo, in the Portuguese archipelago of the Azores.

The cave is situated along the coast near the Porto das Cinco Ribeiras and the surrounding bay, primarily accessible by boat from along the coast.

The geological formation is directly related with the former-volcano of Serra de Santa Bárbara, and is characterized by high areals, lava flows and pyroclasts that created perfect stratifications of geological materials. It is associated specifically with a lava tube and arches created during the eruptions of the Santa Bárbara volcano. The morphology of the location allowed the formation of subaquatic caves popular with divers.

Angra do Heroísmo
Gruta Cinco Ribeiras
Lava tubes